In physics, the term swampland refers to effective low-energy physical theories which are not compatible with quantum gravity. This is in contrast with the so-called "string theory landscape" that are known to be compatible with string theory which is believed to be a consistent quantum theory of gravity. In other words, the Swampland is the set of consistent-looking theories with no consistent ultraviolet completion with the addition of gravity.

Developments in string theory suggest that the string theory landscape of false vacua is vast, so it is natural to ask if the landscape is as vast as allowed by anomaly-free effective field theories. The Swampland program aims to delineate the theories of quantum gravity by identifying the universal principles shared among all theories compatible with a gravitational UV-completion. The program was initiated by Cumrun Vafa, who argued that string theory suggests that the Swampland is in fact much larger than the string theory landscape.

Swampland conjectures
The swampland conjectures are a set of conjectured criteria for theories in the string theory landscape. Some proposed swampland criteria:
 If there is a charge symmetry, that symmetry has to be a gauge symmetry, not a global one, and at least one charged particle must have a mass in Planck units less than the gauge coupling strength. However, not all charged particles are necessarily light. The same applies to magnetic monopoles as well. This criterion would imply the weak gravity conjecture.
 The sign of some higher order terms in the effective action is constrained by the absence of superluminal propagation.
 There are finitely many types of massless particles.

References

External links
 Lecture by Cumrun Vafa, String Landscape and the Swampland, March 2018

String theory
Quantum gravity